Harris Federation is a multi-academy trust of 52 primary and secondary academies in and around London. They are sponsored by Philip Harris (Lord Harris of Peckham).

Description
With 52 academies in London and Essex, the Harris Federation educates around 40,000 children, which is about 1 in 40 London children, and employs 5,000 staff.  Through its "Train to Teach Programme", it provides initial teacher training and inset for teachers from London and the South East.

The sponsor is Philip Harris (Lord Harris of Peckham) who was the former chairman and chief executive of Carpetright. The federation is a not-for-profit charitable organisation.

The Chief Executive Officer is Sir Daniel Moynihan, a former principal of the Harris City Academy Crystal Palace. The Harris Federation headquarters are in East Croydon.

Schools

Nursery

Harris Nursery Hub Peckham, Southwark

Primary schools

Harris Primary Academy Beckenham, Beckenham
Harris Primary Academy Benson, Shirley
Harris Junior Academy Carshalton, Carshalton
Harris Primary Academy Chafford Hundred, Chafford Hundred
Harris Primary Academy Coleraine Park, Tottenham
Harris Primary Academy Crystal Palace, Penge
Harris Primary Academy East Dulwich, East Dulwich
Harris Primary Academy Haling Park, South Croydon
Harris Primary Academy Kenley, Kenley
Harris Primary Academy Kent House, Penge
Harris Primary Academy Mayflower, Chafford Hundred
Harris Primary Academy Merton, Mitcham
Harris Primary Academy Orpington, Orpington
Harris Primary Free School Peckham, Peckham
Harris Primary Academy Peckham Park, Peckham
Harris Primary Academy Philip Lane, Tottenham
Harris Primary Academy Shortlands, Shortlands

Secondary schools

Harris Academy Battersea, Battersea
Harris Academy Beckenham, Beckenham
Harris Academy Bermondsey, Bermondsey
Harris Academy Bromley, Beckenham
Harris Garrard Academy, Bexley
Harris Academy Chafford Hundred, Chafford Hundred
Harris Academy Clapham, Clapham
Harris Invictus Academy Croydon, Croydon
Harris City Academy Crystal Palace, Upper Norwood, Croydon
Harris Boys' Academy East Dulwich, Peckham
Harris Girls' Academy East Dulwich, East Dulwich
Harris Science Academy East London, Newham and Tower Hamlets
Harris Academy Falconwood, Falconwood
Harris Academy Greenwich, Eltham
Harris Academy Merton, Mitcham
Harris Academy Morden, Morden
Harris Academy Wimbledon, Wimbledon
Harris Academy Orpington, Orpington
Harris Academy Peckham, Peckham
Harris Academy Purley, South Croydon
Harris Academy South Norwood, South Norwood
Harris Academy Upper Norwood, Upper Norwood
Harris Academy St John's Wood Marlborough Hill
Harris Academy Riverside, Purfleet
Harris Academy Sutton, Sutton
Harris Academy Rainham, Rainham, London
Harris Academy Ockendon, South Ockendon

All-through schools
Chobham Academy, East Village
Harris Academy Tottenham, Tottenham Hale

Sixth forms
Harris Westminster Sixth Form, Westminster
Harris Invictus Sixth Form, Croydon
Harris Professional Skills Sixth Form, Croydon
Harris Merton Sixth Form, Mitcham

Pupil referral units
Harris Aspire Academy, Beckenham

Results
In 2016, the Department for Education recognised the Harris Federation as a "top performer" in primary and secondary education, when comparing the performance of different multi-academy trusts. In July 2016, researchers at the Education Policy Institute found that "at primary level the Harris Federation is the highest performing school group in England – the improvement it has made is equivalent to pupils making around one and a half times more progress than average".

In 2017, the Harris Federation was recognised by government league tables as being the top performing multi-academy trust (MAT) in England. Commenting on the new performance data, Schools Standards Minister, Nick Gibb, said that the Harris Federation is "leading the way" in delivering excellent results for its pupils.

In 2018, the Department for Education published a league table comparing the performance of all multi-academy trusts. The Harris Federation was ranked the top performing large trust for the progress made by its pupils and for the progress made by its disadvantaged pupils.

Social mobility
In 2014, 2015, 2016, 2017 and 2018 research by the Sutton Trust found that the Harris Federation was among "The best academy chains (for) having a transformational impact on pupils’ life chances".

The Harris Federation runs a cultural enrichment programme that aims to improve outcomes for their brightest students, with activities run with organisations such as LAMDA, the Royal Opera House and Christie's. In summer 2018, the musician Stormzy, who attended a Harris Academy, returned to his old school to launch a scholarship scheme for black students at Cambridge university.

In 2014, the Harris Federation and Westminster School opened the Harris Westminster Sixth Form. The aim of the sixth form, which received 1,000 applications for 250 places, is to help students from London's state schools access top universities. In 2021, 36 students from the sixth form won places at Oxford and Cambridge universities.

In 2019, the Harris Federation opened the first completely free nursery in England. With 55 hours of free childcare per week for 51 weeks of the year for children from economically disadvantaged backgrounds, the Federation said it "had been compelled to provide early years places to the most needy children because they miss out under the existing rules on free nursery places."

Harris Federation academies are the top school for progress in five of the nine boroughs in which the Federation operates and three Harris academies – Harris Academy Battersea, Harris Academy Morden and Harris Academy Bromley – are in the top 1% of schools in the country for pupil progress.

The Harris Federation is the highest performing MAT in the country for pupil progress and EBACC qualifications for disadvantaged students.

In 2018, Harris Academy Battersea received an "Outstanding" rating from Ofsted. Previously known as Battersea Park School and Battersea Technology College, the school became a Harris Academy in 2014 after it was branded inadequate. In one year at the previous school, no pupils gained five or more GCSE passes. In 2003 three percent of children left with five A*-C GCSEs and in 2017 this figure was 83%. The school is now oversubscribed and the percentage of students applying to Russell Group universities has greatly increased. Ofsted said that teachers were proud to work at the academy, that morale was high and pupils of all abilities make "very strong progress".

In 2021, Will.i.am visited Harris City Academy Crystal Palace to film The Blackprint a TV documentary exploring what it means to be black and British. Describing the school as a “a place of black excellence”, he made a donation in order to fund new opportunities for students to study robotics.

Teacher housing 
In 2016, concerned that teachers were being priced out of London because of the cost of accommodation, the Harris Federation launched a campaign for academy trusts to be able to turn unused land on their school sites into affordable housing for teachers.

Ransomware attack 
On 27 March 2021, the federation was attacked by the ransomware gang REvil, which published multiple financial documents of the federation to its blog. As a result, the IT systems of the federation were shut down for some weeks, which had been compromised in the attack, thus disabling 37,000 students' email.

Controversies

Some of the schools within the federation were formerly run by local authorities, and forced by central government to become academies as part of the Harris Federation against the wishes of 94% of the parents and boards of governors. There was national media coverage over Downhills Primary School (now Harris Primary Academy Philip Lane), where it was reported that 94% of parents opposed the change to academy status. At the time, the government said it had decided to close Downhills Primary School and re-open it as a Harris Academy because of "chronic underperformance" at Downhills. According to national news reports, standards of education at Harris Primary Academy Philip Lane quickly improved with the Federation's involvement. Having been in special measures before becoming a Harris academy, its first inspection report after opening found that it was now good with outstanding features.

Reacting to the news that the Harris Primary Academy Philip Lane in the heart of Tottenham, had been unduly helping their pupils in their Key Stage 2 Sats tests, anti-academies campaigner Fiona Millar said "I’ve scrutinised their data and wondered how they get these results with similar cohorts of pupils. Increasingly we see they do it by this unethical behaviour. "

Year 6 pupils were given too much help in their English reading and maths reasoning Sats, according to the Standards and Testing Agency (STA). Thus, pupils’ scores in those papers have been expunged and they will receive scores only for their spelling, punctuation and grammar tests. In a letter sent to parents on Monday, 6 August 2018, the academy's chair of governors, described the investigation findings as “deeply regrettable and disappointing”. However, the school was inspected by Ofsted after this and rated Outstanding, with the schools inspectorate judging that "The academy trust worked swiftly to investigate the maladministration of standardised tests and took appropriate disciplinary action. They have ably managed the school by brokering highly skilled leaders to provide the school with renewed focus and direction."

In 2018, the second primary school run by this academy chain had SATs results annulled. The Standards and Testing Agency cancelled some of the results of former year six pupils at Harris Primary Academy Kent House over fears of “maladministration”.

In 2013 Roke Primary School joined the Harris Federation, against the wishes of some parents and governors who did not want to have academy status.  Now known as Harris Primary Academy Kenley, the academy has since been judged "outstanding" by Ofsted. As part of a local awards scheme, the Principal of the academy was nominated as a 'Croydon Hero' because of the improvements that took place.

The Harris Westminster Sixth Form, which was scheduled to open in 2014, has been criticised for costing £45 million of public money to establish. Before it opened, the former chair of the Public Accounts Committee, Margaret Hodge, called it a "vanity project". However, Ofsted inspected the Sixth Form in autumn 2016, rated it "outstanding" in all areas and praised it for creating "a community of scholars". Its first set of A Levels were described as "outstanding" by The Times, which reported that "almost a third" of pupils "cannot afford to pay for school meals, but they achieved 12% A* grades and 42% A% to A grades".

In 2015 it was reported that Harris Academies had some of the highest turnover of staff amongst schools in the UK, with The Guardian reporting that over a third of Harris teachers leave after just one year, with 1,000 teachers leaving the Federation in three academic years, underlined by 34 leaving Harris Falconwood in 2015 alone. The Anti-Academies Alliance put this high turnover down to poor working conditions, excessive workload and unreasonable pressure on teachers from senior leadership.

In 2019 numerous Harris Academies were accused of "gaming" the system through the practice of entering entire cohorts for the ESOL qualification, which is aimed at students who have English as an additional language (EAL), Harris Falconwood entered the whole of their Year 11 cohort (177 students) despite only having 15 EAL students. This was shown to be common practice across the Federation.

Challenging Ofsted

Harris educates about 2.5% of London school children, and considers itself experienced in increasing the social mobility of children of low income families. It has identified that these children do better with shorter Key Stage 3, and a three-year exam orientated Key stage 4. more colloquially this is spoken of as "three years to do their GCSE". Ofsted recognises that their GCSE results are outstanding but believes that the students are losing out on the wider Keystage 3 experience. The UK Office for Standards in Education, Children's Services and Skills (Ofsted) warned Harris, that schools that used the two plus thee method would lose their "Outstanding status". Harris instructed its 27 secondary academies to switch back to the three plus two model in July 2019. In many schools, this will have accommodation and staffing cost and they may not transition until September 2020.

In January 2020, Martyn Oliver, chief executive of Outwood Grange Academies Trust,  told the Times that "New Ofsted inspections favour middle-class kids. Inspectors, fighting against schools who just teach to the test are taking a far too simplistic a view on when GCSE teaching should begin. Many of the children in Outwood Grange Academies Trust schools need a three-year run up. They don't have books at home and space for homework. All that has to happen in school time and disproportionately their life chances come from qualifications."
 
Moynihan backed him up, "For many of our children qualifications are all they have in their hands at a job interview or college application and beyond. They have no networks, no contacts, no professional people in their family to help them on in life. Their GCSEs are crucial. Ofsted is valuing curriculum over qualifications."
 Ofsted denies that the have produced a middle class framework for middle class kids, or that it has a view on two year key-stage three but it is the mileage travelled not the length of the course that was being judged.

Remuneration debate
In 2017–18, the salary of the CEO of the Harris Federation was in the £440-450,000 bracket which is higher than any other multi-academy trust. The salary has been at the centre of a warning of a "super league" of academy CEO salaries.

Governance
The trust has three sponsors, that, as of 21 March 2021 are Lord Harris, his wife and his son.

Harris Tottenham Controversy 
In April 2021, a petition was started against the head of academy to resign, which reached 6000 signatures within two weeks of its creation. The petition alleged racism and staff bullying.

References

External links
Harris Federation
Dashboard of Harris Academy locations

 
 
Educational charities based in the United Kingdom
Founders of English schools and colleges